Ibrox is a suburb of Glasgow, Scotland. It is situated south of the River Clyde and is part of the former burgh of Govan. The origin of the name Ibrox is unclear. It is often said to come from the Gaelic àth bruic, meaning "badger ford", but this is unconfirmed.

It is within walking distance of the Pacific Quay Media Park, housing BBC Scotland, STV and other production companies along with the Glasgow Science Centre.  The opening of the Clyde Arc provides a road connection to the other side of the River Clyde. Ibrox is served by Ibrox subway station of the Glasgow Subway system.

The home of football club Rangers F.C. is located at Ibrox Stadium.

Ibrox Primary School is a primary school located on Edmiston Drive, the main road through Ibrox, directly across from Ibrox Stadium. The building was designed by Bruce and Hay and was opened in 1906. The school was originally known as Ibrox Board School, was built for the Govan Parish School Board.

Ibrox is home to an original artwork by South African artist Faith47. Located on Copland Road opposite the entrance to Fairley Street, the piece was completed during the preparations for the 2014 Commonwealth Games.

Gallery

See also
 Glasgow tower blocks

References 

Govan
Areas of Glasgow